The 2013–14 Southeastern Louisiana Lady Lions basketball team represented Southeastern Louisiana University during the 2013–14 NCAA Division I women's basketball season. The Lady Lions were led by tenth year head coach Lori Davis Jones and played their home games at the University Center. They are members of the Southland Conference. The Lady Lions entered the season with only one assistant coach after Bob Austin was hired as the head coach at LSU-Alexandria.

Roster

Schedule
Source

|-
!colspan=9| Exhibition

|-
!colspan=9| Regular Season

See also
2013–14 Southeastern Louisiana Lions basketball team

References

Southeastern Louisiana Lady Lions basketball seasons
Southeastern Louisiana
Southeastern Louisiana Lady Lions basketball
Southeastern Louisiana Lady Lions basketball